is a Japanese manga series written and illustrated by Akane Torikai. It was serialized in Kodansha's seinen manga magazine Monthly Morning Two from August 2013 to September 2017, with its chapters collected in 8 tankōbon volumes.

Publication
Kodansha collected its chapters in eight tankōbon volumes, released from February 21, 2014, to October 23, 2017.

In North America, the manga is licensed for English release by Kodansha USA (as a Vertical title). The first volume is set to be published on March 1, 2022.

Volume list

Reception
The series ranked #8 on "The Best Manga 2015 Kono Manga wo Yome!" ranking by Freestyle magazine. It was nominated for the Sugoi Japan Award in 2017. It was nominated for the 22nd Tezuka Osamu Cultural Prize in 2018.

See also
Saturn Return, another manga series by the same author

References

Further reading

External links
 

Drama anime and manga
Kodansha manga
Seinen manga
Teaching anime and manga
Vertical (publisher) titles